Thoracic arteries can refer to:
 Internal thoracic artery
 Lateral thoracic artery
 Superior thoracic artery
 Thoracic aorta (less common)